Oleszka  (German: Oleschka, 1936–45 Nieder Erlen) is a village in the administrative district of Gmina Zdzieszowice, within Krapkowice County, Opole Voivodeship, in south-western Poland.

References

Oleszka